Pamela Gordon Wedner (stage name Pamela Gordon, 8 April 1937 – 21 September 2003) was an American film and stage actress. She was born in Pittsburgh, Pennsylvania.

Her films included Frances (1982), Weird Science (1985), Another Day in Paradise (1998) and Chuck & Buck (2000).

She was acting in Harvey at the Laguna Playhouse six weeks before she died, aged 66.

Filmography

Film

Television

References

External links

1937 births
2003 deaths
Actresses from Pittsburgh
American film actresses
American stage actresses
20th-century American actresses
21st-century American actresses